Deepak Mangla is an Indian politician. He was elected to the Haryana Legislative Assembly from Palwal in the  2019 Haryana Legislative Assembly election as a member of the Bharatiya Janata Party.

References 

1967 births
Living people
Bharatiya Janata Party politicians from Haryana
People from Kaithal
Haryana MLAs 2019–2024